Malchishnik ( — The Stag Night) is a sex rap group from Russia who were the first Russian rap artists to gain mainstream popularity during earlier 1990s.

History

Formation
Initially producer and manager Alexey Adamov aimed to form a commercially successful boy band. The group was planned as a Soviet counterpart of then-popular New Kids on The Block. Emphasis was to be made on sweet appearances and flashy costumes.

Adamov recruited five young guys for the band from Arbat breakdancers. Original band members included vocalists Kris, Klyopa, Dan (Andrey Kotov), Raf and music producer Mutabor (Pavel Galkin).

Adamov then asked Dolphin (Andrey Lisikov), a famed breakdancer, apprentice song-writer and a friend of Dan to write some lyrics for the group. Dolphin was satisfied with his fee, so when Mutabor couldn't practice in group's first tour because of his wedding ceremony, Dolphin agreed to substitute him. He effectively joined Malchishnik in the summer of 1991.

During this tour, Dolphin proposed changing the concept of the band by turning to more "fashionable" and "progressive" music. He suggested modeling their sound after American dirty south pioneers 2 Live Crew. Since Dolphin, Dan and Mutabor all were b-boys, hip hop music was a natural choice for them. Adamov agreed and then excluded all band members except mentioned threesome.

Dolphin practiced as a lyricist, Mutabor as a beatmaker and Dan contributed to both areas, while all three were rapping. Trio went to the studio to record their debut album in 1991.

Rise to fame

Disbandment

Reunion
In 2000 DJ Dan and Mutabor reunited to record new Malchishnik songs. They cite nostalgia and fun as motivational factors.

They have since recorded and released four studio albums and one live record. None gained any mainstream success or media coverage, as they appealed neither to newer generations of hip hop fans nor to pop audience.

Their current record company is Classic Company, a record label which specializes in publishing shanson music, with Malchishnik as their only rap artists.

Both members still maintain solo careers as record producers and club music DJs, as well as "Barbitura" side project.

Discography

Style
Malchishnik was one of the first artists to openly use explicit lyrics on Russian music scene. Frequent use of obscene language and explicit descriptions of sexual acts provided shock value and attracted listeners raised within conservative and asexual Soviet culture.

Their 1990s albums featured production influenced by Miami bass, old school hip hop and synthpop. The lack of modern music equipment in post-Soviet Russia was reflected in the quality of these records.

Their post-hiatus albums showcased more professional production with influences from drum and bass, big beat and crunk.

Reception
Most Russian hip hop fans have always viewed Malchishnik as a pop group. This caused some controversy as to whether Malchishnik should be considered the first Russian rappers or not.

During the first years of their career, they were one of the most popular artists in Russia, particularly among pop-oriented teenagers. With techno and later, house music gaining mainstream popularity in mid-1990s, Russian youth lost interest to hip hop. While 2000s saw the rise of a vivid Russian rap fandom, reunited Malchishnik maintains very limited popularity.

Malchishnik's legacy has influenced some newer Russian dirty rap artists such as Pornorap and Fucktory. These followers stay at the level of popularity that is far below of what Malchishnik had in earlier 1990s, but probably higher than Malchishnik has today.

References

Musical groups from Moscow
Russian hip hop
Russian hip hop musicians
Russian hip hop groups